Mohammad Yazdi (2 July 1931 – 9 December 2020) was an Iranian conservative and principlist cleric who served as the head of Judiciary System of Iran between 1989 and 1999. In 2015, he was elected to lead Iran's Assembly of Experts, defeating Akbar Hashemi Rafsanjani, a former president, by a vote count of 47 to 24.

Early life
Mohammad Yazdi was born in 1931 to a religious family at Isfahan. Sheikh Ali Yazdi, his father, was a student of Sheikh Abdul Karim Haeri and at one of the Isfahan mosques as chief mullah for Friday prayers and ceremonies investigated the people's problems.

Education

At first, Ayatollah Yazdi learned Persian language from his father and then went to Maktab. Also he departed to newly founded school to continue his education. When he went to Qom, he resided at the Feyziyeh School and learned religious courses from scholars such as Mohammad Ali Araki, Ayatollah Sheikh Muhammad Taqi Amoli, Ayatollah Shahroudi, Grand Ayatollah Hossein Borujerdi and Ruhollah Khomeini.

Political career

Before victory of Iranian Revolution

Ayatollah Yazdi usually gave the lectures at mosques and house of scholars. Also he taught Morality course at the Feyziyeh School and discussed politic subjects.
Mohammad Yazdi was exiled by SAVAK many times to Bandar Lengeh, Bushehr and Rudbar.

After victory of Iranian Revolution

After Ayatollah Khamenei became leader of the Islamic Republic, Ayatollah Yazdi served as the president of the Supreme Court. He remained in the post for many years before being replaced by Muhammad Hashemi Shahroudi.
Yazdi was a member of the Assembly of Experts and the Guardian Council. He served as the interim Friday prayer leader of Tehran.

This is some of the political career of Ayatollah Yazdi after The Islamic Revolution as follows:
Management of Imam Khomeini's Office in Qom
Member of the dispute resolution council between Mohammad-Ali Rajai and Abolhassan Banisadr
Member of the Assembly of Experts constitution in 1979
Temporary Tehran's Friday Prayer Imam, 1982 to  late 1990s
Chief Justice of Iran 1989 to 1999
Member of the Assembly of Experts, 1991 to 2016
Member of Iranian Parliament from 1980 to 1988 in Qom and Tehran
Vice chairman of Iranian Parliament in the first and second periods
Member of Guardian Council in the periods of the second, fourth, fifth, sixth and seventh
One of the founders and secretary of Society of Seminary Teachers of Qom

Political views

United States

In the run-up to the February 2016 elections, Yazdi opposed bilateral relations with the United States. In the popular election held in February 2016 for Assembly of Experts candidates, incumbent Chairman Yazdi was not among the 16 experts who received enough votes to represent Tehran in the Fifth Assembly of Experts.

Many western media outlets pointed to Yazdi's exit from the Assembly when providing and emphasizing the gains that reformists made in the 2016 elections. In a speech congratulating those elected to the Fifth Assembly of Experts, Yazdi advocated for peaceful, moderate relations with other countries, but went on to warn about dealing with enemies and characterized America as "The Great Satan". Two days later, Fars News Agency reported the Supreme Leader Ayatollah Khamenei lamented the Assembly's loss of Yazdi as Chairman and warned of the risk that the West could influence or infiltrate Iran. As of 9 May 2016, Yazdi remained on the Guardian Council, which vets potential candidates for the Assembly of Experts. During Yazdi's tenure on the Guardian Council, human-rights organizations have criticized the Guardian Council's disqualification of reform candidates in the 2016 elections.

Sanctions
In February 2020, the U.S. Treasury Department sanctioned Yazdi for "preventing free and fair elections in Iran."

Work
Ayatollah Yazdi authored several books in English and Persian such as, Your missing, Answers of Mardooq's accusations and Imamah in Shia Islam.

Death
Yazdi died on 9 December 2020. He was buried in Qom later that day.

See also

List of Ayatollahs
Council for Spreading Mahmoud Ahmadinejad's Thoughts
Haghani Circle
History of principle-ism in Iran
Society of Seminary Teachers of Qom

References

External links

1931 births
2020 deaths
Iranian ayatollahs
Combatant Clergy Association politicians
Members of the Guardian Council
Chief justices of Iran
Deputies of Tehran, Rey, Shemiranat and Eslamshahr
Members of the 2nd Islamic Consultative Assembly
Members of the 1st Islamic Consultative Assembly
First Deputies of Islamic Consultative Assembly
Second Deputies of Islamic Consultative Assembly
Society of Seminary Teachers of Qom members
Islamic Republican Party politicians
Members of the Assembly of Experts for Constitution
Speakers of the Assembly of Experts
Shia clerics from Isfahan
Iranian individuals subject to the U.S. Department of the Treasury sanctions